The 1894 Arkansas gubernatorial election was held on September 3, 1894.

Incumbent Democratic Governor William Meade Fishback did not stand for re-election.

Democratic nominee James Paul Clarke defeated Republican nominee Harmon L. Remmel and Populist nominee David E. Barker with 58.91% of the vote.

General election

Candidates
James Paul Clarke, Democratic, incumbent Attorney General of Arkansas
Harmon L. Remmel, Republican, former member of the Arkansas House of Representatives
David E. Barker, Populist, former President pro tempore of the Arkansas Senate
Joseph W. Miller, Prohibition

Results

Notes

References

1894
Arkansas
Gubernatorial